An absorbing barrier  may refer to:

 Absorbing barrier (finance), ruin, anything that prevents people with skin in the game from emerging from a financial state.
 Absorbing barrier, an energy-absorbing and energy-dissipating barrier used along roads, for increasing road traffic safety.